Abdul Wahid Adamjee (born 1908) was a Pakistani industrialist.

Early life
Adamjee was born in 1908 in Rangoon, Burma, British India. He completed his education in Burma. He was the eldest son of Adamjee Haji Dawood, the founder of Adamjee Group.

Career
Adamjee joined the Adamjee Group in 1925, he worked in the match factory and rice mill of the group in Burma. From 1938 to 1948, he expanded the group in British India. He succeeded his father as the head of the Adamjee Group and Adamjee family, after his death on 27 January 1948. He expanded the Adamjee Group and played an important role in the industrialization of Pakistan. He founded the Adamjee Jute Mills in Dacca, East Pakistan which was the largest Jute Mills in the world. He established Adamjee Tea Gardens in East Pakistan, then the largest tea fields in the world. In 1958, he was awarded the Hilal-e-Pakistan by the Government of Pakistan. He served as the chairman of Pakistan Industrial Credit and Investment Corporation. The Adamjee group was estimated to be worth more than 60 million dollar in 1971, more than half of which was lost when Bangladesh became an independent country.

Death
Adamjee died on 4 July 1972 in Karachi, Pakistan.

References

1908 births
1972 deaths
Memon people
Pakistani philanthropists
Pakistan Movement activists
Businesspeople from Karachi
Pakistani people of Gujarati descent
Pakistani industrialists
Gujarati people
20th-century philanthropists
Recipients of Hilal-i-Pakistan